Budesonide/glycopyrronium bromide/formoterol, sold under the brand name Breztri Aerosphere among others, is an inhalable fixed-dose combination medication for the treatment of chronic obstructive pulmonary disease (COPD). It contains budesonide, glycopyrronium bromide, and formoterol fumarate dihydrate. It is inhaled.

The most common side effects include oral candidiasis (a fungal infection of the mouth), upper respiratory tract infection, pneumonia, back pain, muscle spasms, influenza, urinary tract infection, cough, sinusitis, and diarrhea. Headache is also a common side effect.

The combination was approved for medical use in the United States in July 2020, and in the European Union in December 2020.

Medical uses 
Budesonide/glycopyrronium bromide/formoterol is indicated for the maintenance treatment of chronic obstructive pulmonary disease (COPD) in adults.

Society and culture

Legal status 
Trixeo Aerosphere was approved for medical use in the European Union in December 2020. Riltrava Aerosphere was approved for medical use in the European Union in January 2022.

See also 
 Glycopyrronium bromide/formoterol

References

External links
 
 
 

AstraZeneca brands
Beta-adrenergic agonists
Bronchodilators
Combination drugs
Corticosteroids
Glucocorticoids
Muscarinic antagonists